The 23rd Polish Film Awards took place on 21 June 2021 at the Służewiec Racecourse in Warsaw, Poland. The ceremony honored the best in Polish cinema of 2020, presented by the Polish Film Academy. It was hosted by presenter Grażyna Torbicka.

Winners and nominees
The nominations were announced on 22 April 2021. Winners are listed first, highlighted in boldface, and indicated with a double dagger.

Films with multiple awards and nominations

References

External links
 

Polish Film Awards ceremonies
Polish Film Awards
Polish Film Awards